Gale A. Yee (born 1949) is an American scholar of the Hebrew Bible. Her primary emphases are postcolonial criticism, ideological criticism, and cultural criticism. She applies feminist frameworks to biblical texts. An American of Chinese descent, she has written frequently on biblical interpretation from an Asian American perspective.

Early life and education 
Yee was born in Cincinnati, Ohio, on April 9, 1949. She attended the Academy of Our Lady High School, graduating in 1967.

She earned a Bachelor of Arts degree in English literature in 1973 and a Master of Arts degree in the New Testament in 1975, both at Loyola University of Chicago. She completed her Doctor of Philosophy degree in 1985 in the Old Testament at the University of St. Michael's College in the Toronto School of Theology.

Career 
In 1987, Yee published her dissertation as Composition and Tradition in the Book of Hosea: A Redactional Critical Investigation with Scholars Press (Society of Biblical Literature Dissertation Series 102).

From 1998 until 2017, she was the Nancy W. King Professor of Biblical Studies at the Episcopal Divinity School. From 1984 to 1998, she served as Professor of Hebrew Bible and Director of Women's Studies at the University of St. Thomas (St. Paul, MN). She is the former general editor of Semeia Studies. She and Athalya Brenner have worked together to edit commentaries in the Texts@Contexts series for Fortress Press.

On November 19, 2017, Yee was elected as Vice-President of the Society of Biblical Literature in 2018, leading to the position as President of the SBL in 2019. On November 24, 2019, she delivered the presidential address at the SBL Annual Meeting in 2019 in San Diego, California.

She has donated her papers (1966–2014) to the Burke Library (Columbia University Libraries) at Union Theological Seminary in New York.

Honors 
Yee was honored as a qianbei ("respected elder") at the 2014 International Congress of Ethnic Chinese Biblical Scholars, received the Graduate Theological Foundation's Krister Stendahl Medal in 2015, and received the Society of Biblical Literature's "Status of Women in the Profession Committee Mentor Award" in 2016. She received an honorary doctorate from Virginia Theological Seminary in 2020.

Gale A. Yee was president of the Society of Biblical Literature in 2019.

Works

Books

Edited 

 The Hebrew Bible: Feminist and Intersectional Perspectives (with Athalya Brenner and Archie C. C. Lee), Minneapolis: Fortress Press, 2018.  OCLC 1007036296
 Honouring the Past, Looking to the Future: Essays from the 2014 International Congress of Ethnic Chinese Biblical Scholars (with Matthew Coomber and Hugh Page), Shatin: The Divinity School of Chung Chi College, The Chinese University of Hong Kong, 2016.
 The Fortress Commentary on Bible: The Old Testament and  Apocrypha (with Athalya Brenner), Minneapolis: Fortress Press, 2014.
 Joshua and Judges. Texts@Contexts Series (with Athalya Brenner), Minneapolis: Fortress Press, 2013.

See also 

 Asian American biblical hermeneutics
 Asian feminist theology

References

External links 
 Gale A. Yee's CV

1949 births
20th-century American non-fiction writers
20th-century Christian biblical scholars
21st-century American non-fiction writers
21st-century Christian biblical scholars
Academics from Ohio
American academics of Chinese descent
American biblical scholars
American Marxists
Women Marxists
American women non-fiction writers
Christian feminist biblical scholars
Episcopal Divinity School faculty
Female biblical scholars
Living people
Loyola University Chicago alumni
Marxist feminists
Marxist writers
Old Testament scholars
University of St. Michael's College alumni
Writers from Cincinnati
21st-century American women writers